Əzgilli (also, Azgilo, Ezgilli, and Ezgilly) is a former village in the Zaqatala Rayon of Azerbaijan.

References

External links

Populated places in Zaqatala District